The 2005–06 Swedish Figure Skating Championships were held in Karlskrona from December 7 through 14, 2005. Because they were held in December, they were officially designated by the Swedish federation as the 2005 Swedish Championships, but the champions are the 2006 Swedish Champions. Skaters competed in the disciplines of men's singles and ladies' singles, with the results among the selection criteria for the 2006 Winter Olympics, the 2006 World Championships, the 2006 European Championships, and the 2006 World Junior Championships.

Senior results

Men
Michael Chrolenko of Norway was a guest competitor, but had to withdraw during the competition.

Ladies

External links
 results

2005 in figure skating
2006 in figure skating
Swedish Figure Skating Championships
Figure Skating Championships
Figure Skating Championships
Sports competitions in Karlskrona